Results from the 1987 Buenos Aires Grand Prix held at Buenos Aires on December 6, 1987, in the Autódromo Oscar Alfredo Gálvez. The race was a first race of a 1° Festival Automovilistico Internacional de Formula 3.

Classification 

1987
1987 in motorsport
1987 in Argentine motorsport
December 1987 sports events in South America